Leonardo Augusto dos Santos Pereira (born 27 September 1999), commonly known as Léo Pereira, is a Brazilian professional footballer who plays as a winger for Marítimo, on loan from Atlético Goianiense.

Club career

Grêmio
Born in Bauru, Brazil, Léo Pereira joined the Grêmio's Academy at the age of 20 in 2020 on loan from Ituano.

Career statistics

Club

Honours
 Grêmio
Campeonato Gaúcho: 2021
Recopa Gaúcha: 2021

Atlético Goianiense
Campeonato Goiano: 2022

References

External links

Profile at the Grêmio F.B.P.A. website

2000 births
Living people
People from Bauru
Brazilian footballers
Footballers from São Paulo (state)
Association football forwards
Campeonato Brasileiro Série A players
Campeonato Brasileiro Série C players
Campeonato Brasileiro Série D players
Primeira Liga players
Ituano FC players
Sport Club Corinthians Paulista players
Grêmio Foot-Ball Porto Alegrense players
Atlético Clube Goianiense players
C.S. Marítimo players
Expatriate footballers in Portugal
Brazilian expatriate sportspeople in Portugal